Thomas Mansfield Page (February 4, 1931 – May 11, 2022) was a former American football coach. He served as head coach at Sam Houston State University in Huntsville, Texas from 1968 to 1971, compiling a record of 20–19–3. After he served as an assistant coach for the Bearkats for over a decade, Page was promoted to head coach in December 1967 after Paul Pierce resigned to take a full-time faculty position. He resigned from Sam Houston after their 1971 season to go into private industry.

Head coaching record

References

1931 births
2022 deaths
Auburn Tigers football players
Sam Houston Bearkats football coaches
People from Atmore, Alabama